Netzer Olami is the worldwide youth movement of the World Union for Progressive Judaism (WUPJ) and is affiliated to Arzenu (the Zionist arm of the WUPJ). "Netzer" is an acronym in Hebrew for Reform Zionist Youth (Noar Tsioni Reformi, נוער ציוני רפורמי), and Netzer Olami means 'Global Netzer'.

Today there are 16,000 members active in the different sniffim (chapters) that are located in the following places: Australia, Belarus, Brazil, Costa Rica, Germany, Israel (Noar Telem), The Netherlands, North America (NFTY), Panama, Russia, South Africa, France, United Kingdom (LJY-Netzer, RSY-Netzer) and Ukraine. The Netzer Olami head office is in Beit Shmuel, (The Head Office the World Union for Progressive Judaism) in Jerusalem.

The Netzer symbol

The Netzer symbol was designed in Melbourne, Australia, by Daniel (Danny) L. Schiff.

Ideology
Every year, the Netzer Veida Olamit (the decision-making and ideology forum) attracts participants from most of, if not all, the sniffim. Each snif (branch) has an equal voice and vote. The official ideology of Netzer Olami is set out in the Netzer Olami Platform, which was last changed in 2016.

See also
 Zionist youth movement
 Reform Zionism
 Tikkun Olam

References

External links
World Union for Progressive Judaism: Netzer Olami
 
Jewish youth organizations
Reform Judaism outreach
World Union for Progressive Judaism
Reform Zionism